Rae'Ven Larrymore Kelly (born June 28, 1985) is an American actress.

Life and career
Kelly was born in Fairfax, Virginia. She later moved to Atlanta, Georgia for better exposure in her film career.  Kelly was taught by Janet Lawing at Covenant Presbyterian preschool in Marietta, Georgia.  She graduated Valedictorian from Sunland Christian Academy in Sunland, California and attended Hillcrest Christian School in Granada Hills, California.

She attended Mount St. Mary's College in Brentwood and is a graduate of UCLA in Westwood.

Has been nominated for over 4 NAACP Image Awards for Outstanding Youth Performance. In 2009, she won Best Lead Actress at The NAACP Theater Awards in Beverly Hills.

She is goddaughter of late actress and civil rights activist Yolanda King, daughter of Dr. Martin Luther King, Jr. King and Kelly starred in 3 films together HBO's America's Dream, Odessa and they shared the same role of Reena Evers in Ghosts of Mississippi, daughter of assassinated civil rights leader Medgar Evers.

She is the adopted granddaughter of actors Cicely Tyson, Bill Cobbs, and Marla Gibbs. Tyson, Cobbs, and Gibbs all adopted Kelly as their granddaughter after playing her grandparents on film.

She performed in several film and television projects such as A Time to Kill and What's Love Got to Do with It as young Tina Turner. Kelly has also appeared in guest-starring roles on shows like E.R. and Roseanne. In early 2010 Kelly played Marcia in the movie Preacher's Kid.

Filmography

Awards and nominations

 1993, win, Young Artist Award for Outstanding Actress Under Ten in a Television Series for I'll Fly Away
 1994, win, Young Artist Award for Youth Actress Leading Role in a Television Series, for I'll Fly Away
 1995, win, Young Artist Award for Best Performance by a Youth Actress in a TV Miniseries or Special for Lily in Winter
 1995, win, Young Artist Award for Best Performance by a Youth Actress – TV Guest Star for Sweet Justice
 1997, nomination, Young Star Awards for 'Best Performance by a Young Actress in a Drama Film' for A Time to Kill
 1998, nomination, Young Artist Award for 'Best Performance in a TV Movie or Feature Film – Young Ensemble' for The Ditchdigger's Daughters
 2000, nomination, Young Star Awards for 'Best Young Actress/Performance in a Miniseries/Made-For-TV Film' for Freedom Song
 2009, win, NAACP Theater Awards Best Lead Actress in a Play for Turpentine Jake

References

External links

Biography at Filmreference.com

1985 births
Actresses from Virginia
African-American Christians
Living people
Actors from Fairfax, Virginia
American cheerleaders
African-American women singer-songwriters
University of California, Los Angeles alumni
21st-century American actresses
20th-century American actresses
American television actresses
African-American actresses
American film actresses
American child actresses
Singer-songwriters from Virginia
21st-century African-American women singers